Sayed Mohamed Adnan (born 5 February 1983) is a Bahraini footballer who once played for the national team, and currently playing for Al Hidd.

International career
He was a member of the Bahrain national football team starting from 2004. In 2009, he was nominated for the Asian Player of The Year award.

In the final round of the 2010 World Cup Qualifications he missed a crucial penalty against New Zealand which left the whole nation in sadness after just missing out on the FIFA World Cup for the second time in succession.

Club career

Brisbane Roar, Australia
On 17 July 2011, it was reported in the Australian media that Adnan was on trial with 2010-11 A-League Champions Brisbane Roar. On 16 August 2011, he signed a one-year contract with the club. Adnan scored his first goal for Brisbane from a free-kick against Sydney FC. On 9 July 2012, it was announced that Adnan would not be extending his contract with Brisbane and that he would return home to his family in Bahrain.

Al Arabi Kuwait
On 28 July 2012, it was reported on the Al Arabi Sporting Club website that Adnan signed a one-year deal worth US$500,000 to play for the Kuwaiti Premier League side.

Al Arabi Qatar
On 28 May 2013, he signed a deal with the Qatar Stars League side Al-Arabi.

Al-Hidd Bahrain
In 2014–2016, he played for top flight Al-Hidd Sports and Cultural Club in Bahrain.

Al Ahli Dohar
He played for Al Ahli in 2016–2017.

2011 detention for dissent in Bahrain
On 5 April 2011, along with members of the Bahrain national football team A'ala and Mohamed Hubail, Sayed Mohamed Adnan was arrested by the Bahraini authorities, who claimed that the footballers had taken part in "illegal, violent protests". Local human rights activists maintained that the three footballers, together with more than 150 other sportsmen, women and administrators, had been targeted for punishment because they had been involved in protests against the government.

On 23 June, it was announced that Mohamed Hubail had been secretly tried and sentenced to two years in prison by the Bahraini special security court established under the martial law regime imposed in March 2011. On 24 June FIFA, the world football governing body, announced that it had asked the Bahraini football authorities to provide information about cases of players detained during political protests.

Following allegations of government interference in the sport after Mohammed Hubail's prison sentence and the suspension of over 150 athletes, coaches and referees for taking part in anti-government protests, Bahrain faced a ban from world football. Suspension by FIFA could prevent Bahrain participating in Asian Olympic Games qualifying round match.

According to the Office of the United Nations High Commissioner for Human Rights in Geneva, the trials appeared to bear the marks of political persecution and there were serious concerns that the due process rights of the defendants were not respected. On 29 June 2011 the Bahrain News Agency reported that the Bahrain Defence Force military public prosecutor had announced that "defendants involved at medical and sport crimes" had been released, but trials would continue in accordance with Bahraini legal procedures.

External links

References

1983 births
Living people
Bahraini footballers
Bahraini expatriate footballers
Bahrain international footballers
Expatriate footballers in Qatar
Bahraini expatriate sportspeople in Qatar
A-League Men players
Brisbane Roar FC players
Al Ahli SC (Doha) players
Al-Khor SC players
Al-Arabi SC (Qatar) players
Qatar Stars League players
Expatriate footballers in Kuwait
Footballers at the 2006 Asian Games
Malkiya Club players
Association football defenders
Asian Games competitors for Bahrain
2004 AFC Asian Cup players
2007 AFC Asian Cup players
Al-Arabi SC (Kuwait) players
Kuwait Premier League players
Bahraini expatriate sportspeople in Kuwait
Hidd SCC players
Bahraini Premier League players
Manama Club players
Bahraini expatriate sportspeople in Australia
Expatriate footballers in Austria